"My Love on You", also referred to as "Love On You", is a song recorded by Romanian recording artist Anda Adam for her studio album, Amo (2013). It was released for digital download on 26 November 2009, while a digital remix EP containing remixes of the songs from DJs from different countries was also made available for purchase. The track reached commercial success, eventually peaking at number one in Turkey and at number seven on the native Romanian Top 100. According to the Romanian Year-End Chart from 2010, "My Love on You" was broadcast overall at least 6.000 times in Romania that year.

Critical reception
The critical reception for the song was mostly positive, with music critics praising Adam's voice performance and the track's instrumentation.

Music video

Background
The official music video for "My Love on You" was shot on January 15, 2010 at the Atlantis Studios in Bucharest, Romania by Iulian Moga.

Synopsis
The clip opens with Adam lying in a dark room and a light reflecting on her. Following this, she is shortly seen in a transparent box and dancing with her female and male backup dancers in a green room. Cut scenes for that scene portray her sitting on a motocycle. Subsequently, Adam is seen again inside the steamy box from the beginning, where she is sweating and trying to escape. Upon her escape, the music video ends with the opening scene.

Track listings
 Digital download
 "Love On You" (Radio Edit) – 3:22
 Digital remix album
 "Love On You (Extended Version)" – 5:26
 "Love On You (Radio Edit)" – 2:22
 "Love On You (Zrecords Remix -Romania-)" – 5:49
 "Love On You (Pat Farell Remix -Switzerland-)" – 6:37
 "Love On You (DJ Pantelis Remix -Greece-)" – 5:52
 "Love On You (DJ Aslam Remix -Egypt-)" – 5:29
 "Love On You (Ghony & Aslam Remix-Egypt-)" – 6:35
 "Love On You (Ian Sanchez Remix -Spain-)" – 6:40
 "Love On You (OJA. Sen & DJ Ashish B Remix -United States-)" – 3:04
 "Love On You (DJ Mert Hakan Remix -Turkey-)" – 5:05
 Digital remix EP
 "My Love On You - Radio Edit" – 3:20
 "My Love On You - Short Radio Version" – 2:39
 "My Love On You - Remix" – 5:48
 "My Love On You - Extended Version" – 5:32

Charts

Weekly charts

Year-end Charts

References

2010 singles
English-language Romanian songs
Eurodance songs
Dance-pop songs
Romanian songs
2009 songs
Anda Adam songs